Fredrik Wilhelm Wedel-Jarlsberg (1787-1863) was a Danish-Norwegian baron and government official. He was a descendant of the Counts of Wedel-Jarlsberg.  He served as the County Governor of Finnmark county from 1811 until 1813.  He was then transferred to Bratsberg county to be the County Governor there.  He held that post from 1813 until 1838.  After his time as governor, he became a customs inspector based in Porsgrunn and then in 1844 he moved to the same position in Larvik.  He retired in 1859.

References

1787 births
1863 deaths
County governors of Norway